This article lists historical events that occurred between 901–1000 in modern-day Lebanon or regarding its people.

Administration

The Qarmatians
Baalbek witnessed turbulent conditions when the Qarmatians appeared in the Levant in the year 290 AH / 905 AD under the command of Al-Hussein bin Zikrawayh bin Mehrawih, who succeeded his brother Yahya bin Zikrawayh, the founder of the Qarmatian revolt, and Al Hussein succeeded in occupying Damascus and Homs. And his forces started a series of devastating theft and extreme looting. In the same year he marched to Baalbek and put the sword to the necks of its people, killing the majority of its inhabitants, and contemporary historians' statements confirm his harsh revenge against the people of Baalbek, and do not give a reason for the killing. Al-Tabari and Ibn Al-Atheer agreed on the following statement: “He killed most of its people until there was nothing left of them - as was said - except for a little, then he killed the animals.”

The Tulunids

The Tulunids were overthrown by the sailor Demian, known as “Demian of Tyre,” who was famously known for repelling the Byzantines, along with the great sailor Leo of Tripoli, the Tyrian naval fleet achieved a victory over the Byzantines under the leadership of the Qadi Muhammad ibn al-Abbas al-Jamahi in the year 296 AH / 908 AD.

The Abbasids
Under the command of Ibn Zakarwayh, Baalbek disobeyed al-Muktafi and began to pray and preach to the leader of the Qarmatians. But Muhammad bin Suleiman, a senior official and commander of the Abbasid Caliphate, was able to return the whole of the Levant to the fold of the caliphate after he got rid of its Qarmatian influence and put down their revolution in the year 291 AH / 906 AD. Baalbek returned to the authority of the Abbasids.

Tyre re-entered the possession of the Abbasid leader "Muhammad bin Ra'iq" in the year 327 AH / 938 AD, where he stayed for some time with a Ghulam named Mashreq. And before Ibn Ra’iq went to Baghdad in the year 329 AH / 940 AD, he gave Tyre and Jordan to “Badr bin Ammar” the ruler of Tiberias - also said to be the ruler of Tripoli.

The Ikhshidids

Baalbek was oscillating between the rule of the Ikhshidids and the Hamdanids. Following the death of Muhammad bin Ra’iq, the Abbasid leader of the Levant in the year 330 AH / 941 AD, Muhammad bin Tughj, nicknamed Ikhshid, annexed the Levant to Egypt, and in the year 333 AH / 944 AD the Abbasid ruler Al-Mustakfi approved him over Egypt and the Levant.

Revolt of Tripoli
In Tripoli, 357 AH corresponding to the year 968 AD, there was a revolution against the Ikhshidid rule as a result of the tyranny of the governor, Abu al-Hasan Ahmed bin Ghurair al-Arghli, and his injustice and cruelty in the treatment of the people. It is known that Tripoli was affiliated at the time to the Wilayat of Damascus, and that the Damascene wali is the one who appoints the governor of Tripoli. And in the meantime, the Byzantine Emperor Nikephoros Phocas II arrived in Tripoli in his campaign on the Levant in an attempt to take it from the Muslims, where he had seized the north of the country, including Arqa. Where he arrested Abu Al-Hassan bin Ghurair Al-Arghli and took all his money, then he went to Tripoli and went down to it on the day of Eid Al-Adha and stayed in it that night and burned its territory and returned to the coastal countries.

The Hamdanids
After the establishment of the Hamdanid state in Aleppo, Saif al-Dawla extended his authority to Baalbek  in the year 335 AH / 947 AD. Although Damascus revolted against Sayf al-Dawla, and favored the Ikhshidids when Kafur al-Ikhshidi regained it, Baalbek separated from Damascus, and remained a fortress for Sayf al-Dawla until his death in the year 356 AH / 967 AD. After the death of Saif al-Dawla, the Byzantines invaded it, and plundered it along with all the other Hamdanid cities.

The Fatimids
In the year 359 AH / 970 AD, the Fatimid leader (Jawhar) arrived in Damascus and took possession of it and then he went to Baalbek and subjugated it and performed a sermon in it to the Fatimid Caliph Al-Mu’izz after it had been to the Abbasid Al-Muti’.

Anti-Fatimid rebellions
In 975, the anti-Fatimid rebel Alptakin resolved to extend his influence over the Bekaa Valley and the coastal Lebanese cities shortly after his occupation of Damascus, so he marched towards Baalbek to fight Zālim Ibn Mawhūb, and succeeded in defeating him. He fled and hid with Prince Tamim bin Al-Mundhir bin Al-Nu`man Al-Arslani, then he wrote to Al-Mu`izz informing him of the situation, so Al-Mu`izz ordered him to reside in Sidon.

Tyrian Revolt

A revolt was led by a sailor named Allaqa took place in Tyre against Fatimid influence and perceived neglect, the rebels drove out the Fatimids for two years until the revolt was suppressed with the help of Hamdanid prince Abu Abdallah al-Husayn in 998, whereby the latter was subsequently assigned as governor of the city and its surroundings.

Events

900s 

 The Qarmatians appear in the Levant in the year 290 AH / 905 AD, starting a series of massacres and looting of the Lebanese inhabitants.
 Muhammad bin Suleiman crushes the Qarmatian revolution in the year 291 AH / 906 AD, returning Lebanon to the Abbasids.
 The Tyrian Abbasid naval fleet achieves a victory over the Byzantines in the year 296 AH / 908 AD.

910s
 Qusta ibn Luqa, a Tyrian-born Melkite Christian physician, philosopher, astronomer, mathematician and translator, dies in 912 at the age of 92 years, Bagratid Armenia.
 Ibn Jumay' Al Sidawi (The Sidonian), a 'ālim in the hadith and an expert in Biographical evaluation, is born in Sidon, 917 AD.

930s
 Lebanon re-enters the Abbasid caliphate under the Abbasid leader "Muhammad bin Ra'iq" in the year 327 AH / 938 AD.
 Beth Maroun and many Maronite monasteries are completely destroyed. Subsequently, the Maronite Patriach Youhanna the Second leaves Syria to the mountains of Lebanon, 938 AD. Subsequently, the monastery of The Virgin of Ianosh (Anoch) becomes with Maronite Patriarch Yuhanna in the same year the patriarchal seat of the Maronite Church, Yanouh.

940s

 Kafur al-Ikhshidi, the mediator between the byzantines and the ikhshidids, sails with sheikh Abu Umair and the Byzantine emperor’s ambassador from Tyre to Tarsus, finishing their diplomatic mission in october, 940 AD.
 Muhammad bin Tughj annexes Lebanon to the Ikhshidid state, 941 AD.
 Beginning of the Shi'a Century, 945 AD.
 The Hamdanid Saif al-Dawla extends his authority to Baalbek in the year 335 AH / 947 AD.

950s
 Abbasid-era Shi'ite poet Abdul Muhsin the Tyrian is born, 950 AD.

960s
 Start of the anti-Ikhshidid revolt of Tripoli, 968 AD.
 After the year 969 AD, the Fatimid state in Egypt succeeds the Ikhshidid state and extend their rule over Lebanon.

970s

 The Fatimid military leader Jawhar takes possession of Baalbek, 970 AD.
 In 974, the Byzantine Emperor John I Tzimiskes gains Beirut and stays there for about a year before getting expelled by Egyptian forces.
 In 975, military general and anti-Fatimid rebel al-Aftakin occupies the Bekaa, Sidon, and Baalbek.
 In 975, Tzimiskes's forces take from Aftakin's forces: Baalbek, Sidon, and Beirut, in which he brought with him a wonderworking icon of Christ from the era of Athanasius from Beirut to Constantinople. He also invaded Byblos, and Tripoli, but failed to take Jerusalem.

980s
 Byzantine general Bardas Phocas leaves Homs in the direction of the Beqaa to reach and invade Tripoli, 983 AD.
 Hamza ibn Ali, founder of the druze religion, is born in 985 AD.

990s
 Military forces of the Byzantine general Dalassenos raid the environs of Tripoli and Arqa, 996 AD.

 The Revolt of Tyre, an anti-Fatimid rebellion by the populace of the city of Tyre, in modern Lebanon, begins in 996.
 In 996, shortly before al-Aziz's death, Abu Abdallah al-Husayn is appointed governor of Tyre, and is tasked with suppressing the city's revolt.
 General Dalassenos raids Tripoli again, 997 AD.
 Tyre is re-occupied by the Fatimids in May 998 and is plundered with its defenders getting either massacred or taken captive to Egypt, where 'Allaqa, the leader of the revolt, is flayed alive and crucified, while many of his followers, as well as 200 Byzantine captives, get executed.
 Byzantine emperor Basil II leads several raids against Baalbek, Beirut, and Byblos, December of 999. He also led a failed siege against Tripoli in the same month.

Industry
Among the most prominent industries of the Fatimids that spread in Lebanon was the manufacture of brocade clothes and the manufacture of the Tunfusah (طُنْفُسَةٌ). The city of Tyre excelled in making beads and glass and extracting sugar, and Tripoli was famous for making paper for writing. The ports of the Lebanese coast were a popular market for all agricultural and industrial products, as well as a center for their export to the cities of the Mediterranean Basin.

Architecture

 "Qalaat Al-Mu’izz", a fortress attributed to the Fatimid Al-Mu'izz li-Din Allah (ruled 341-365 AH / 952-975 AD), old city, Sidon.

See also

 Druze
 Shi'a Century
 Qarmatians
 Tulunids
 Ikhshidid dynasty
 Hamdanids
 Fatimids

References

Sources 
 
 
 CARTER, Terry & DUNSTON, Lara. Libano, Torino, EDT, 2004. 
 SALIBI, Kamal. A House of Many Mansions: The History of Lebanon Reconsidered, London, I.B. Tauris, 1988. 
 MOURAD, Bariaa. Du Patrimoine à la Muséologie : Conception d'un musée sur le site archéologique de Tyr, Thèse de DEA (études doctorales); Museum National d'Histoire Naturelle (MNHN), Étude réalisée en coopération avec l'Unesco, Secteur de la Culture, Division du Patrimoine Culturel, 1998.
 KHURI, Elias & BEYDOUN, Ahmad. Rappresentare il Mediterraneo. Lo sguardo libanese, Messina, Mesogea, 2006. 
 
 
 

990s conflicts
10th-century rebellions
10th century in the Fatimid Caliphate
Tyre
Rebellions against the Fatimid Caliphate
History of Tyre, Lebanon
Tyre
996
997
998
Syria under the Fatimid Caliphate